Green Hills Fantasy is a musical piece composed by Thomas Doss describing the Upper Austrian region of Mühlviertel (literally German for the Mühl Quarter or District).

History has it that the area of Mühlviertel was once besieged by the Celts, who spread fear and terror among the inhabitants.
The people opposed the enemy with patience and courage, and finally, the Celts had to withdraw from Mühlviertel. 

The piece begins with the Timpani, the Bass Drum and the Low Tom beating together in harmony with the melody by the Trombones and the Euphoniums. The rest of the band then start playing a war tune.

This work is commissioned by the 'Viertelfest' in the Austrian region of Mühlviertel.

References

Contemporary classical compositions
Austrian music
Upper Austria